Phil Saunders (September 10, 1920 – March 15, 1997) was a soldier who fought in World War II, an American attorney and 19th Attorney General of South Dakota from 1955 to 1959. Born in Milbank, South Dakota, he was married to the niece of U.S. Senator Francis Case.

Career
Saunders was a Republican.

Saunders graduated from the Northwestern University School of Law.

1954 Attorney General election
On July 27, 1954, Saunders was nominated by acclimation, something Governor Sigurd Anderson stated he thought that was the first time the nomination for Attorney General for a first term without a contest. Saunders general election opponent was Democrat Fred Nichols. Saunders was elected Attorney General in 1954.

1956 Attorney General election

On July 16, 1956, Saunders was again nominated by acclimation in his re-election bid at the state convention in Pierre. Saunders defeated Democrat William H. Heuermann by obtaining 156,149 votes to Heuermann's 127,988 votes. Saunders was re-elected Attorney General in 1956.

1958 gubernatorial election
In 1958, Saunders ran for Governor of South Dakota. He defeated L. Roy Houck for the Republican nomination, and lost to Ralph Herseth in the general election.

References

1920 births
1997 deaths
20th-century American lawyers
American military personnel of World War II
Military personnel from South Dakota
Northwestern University Pritzker School of Law alumni
People from Grant County, South Dakota
South Dakota Attorneys General
South Dakota Republicans